Agonopterix alpigena is a moth of the family Depressariidae. It is found in France, Germany, Switzerland, Austria, Italy and  Croatia.

The larvae feed on the leaves of Laserpitium siler, Laserpitium latifolium and Ligusticum lucidum. The species overwinters as an adult.

References

Moths described in 1870
Agonopterix
Moths of Europe
Taxa named by Heinrich Frey